The following players were on the roster of the nine Rugby-Bundesliga clubs for 2008-09

Clubs

Berliner Rugby Club

 Coach:  Colin Grzanna
 Source: Berliner Rugby Club team info at totalrugby.de

RK 03 Berlin

 Coach:  Christian Lill
 Source: RK 03 Berlin team info at totalrugby.de

SC 1880 Frankfurt

 Coach:  Lofty Stevenson
 Source: SC 1880 Frankfurt team info at totalrugby.de

DRC Hannover

 Coach:  George Kenrick
 Source: DRC Hannover team info at totalrugby.de

Heidelberger RK 

 Coach:  Murray Archibald
 Source: Heidelberger RK team info at totalrugby.de

RG Heidelberg

 Coach:  Thomas Kurzer
 Source: RG Heidelberg team info at totalrugby.de

RK Heusenstamm

 Coach:  Jens Steinweg
 Source: RK Heusenstamm team info at totalrugby.de

TSV Handschuhsheim

 Coach:  Mathias Bechtel
 Source: TSV Handschuhsheim team info at totalrugby.de

SC Neuenheim

 Coach:  Mark Kuhlmann 
 Source: SC Neuenheim team info at totalrugby.de

References

External links
 rugbyweb.de - Rugby-Bundesliga table & results  
 Rugby-Journal - Bundesliga table & results  
 Totalrugby.de - Bundesliga table & results 

squads